was a Japanese shōnen manga magazine published by Kodansha and first launched with a cover date of September 5, 1983. Its audience demographic is geared toward younger teenage boys, and contents tend to be predominantly sports stories and high school romantic comedies. Many of the popular series in Magazine Special were transferred there from other Kodansha publications like Weekly Shōnen Magazine after their initial run. It is issued monthly on the 20th in perfect-bound B5 format and retails for 540 yen. Issues are typically about 600 pages printed in black and white on heavy newsprint, with a few glossy pages in color. Between 20 and 30 stories appear in each issue, almost all of them installments of ongoing and frequently long-running serials by different manga artists.

In August 2016 it was announced that the magazine would cease publication with the February 2017 issue.

Series

References

External links
  

1983 establishments in Japan
2017 disestablishments in Japan
Defunct magazines published in Japan
Kodansha magazines
Magazines established in 1983
Magazines disestablished in 2017
Magazines published in Tokyo
Monthly manga magazines published in Japan
Shōnen manga magazines